The history of rail transport in Liberia began shortly after World War II, when the Freeport of Monrovia was completed, with limited rail access.  It had been developed by American military forces.

In the early 1960s, three long distance railway lines were constructed in Liberia, mainly for the transport of iron ore from mines to port facilities.

All three of these lines were later closed down, due to the effects of the two Liberian Civil Wars (1989–1996 and 1999–2003).  As of August 2010, only the Bong Mine Railway had been restored to operational condition.

Beginnings 
In the 19th century, Liberia found it difficult to get foreign loans which made infrastructure projects almost impossible. Under the presidency of Edward James Roye, a plan was drawn up to find foreign capital to build a railway into the interior in 1871, but after Roye's assassination, the funds were directed elsewhere and the railway was never built. As early as the 1920s, the establishment of railways was envisaged as part of the economic development of Liberia's mineral resources.  These railways would have been constructed by the British Liberian Development Company. The national bankruptcy of Liberia and the intervention of the U.S. firm Firestone Tire & Rubber Company foiled these plans.

During World War II, the United States began preparations for the exploitation of the iron ore deposits in Liberia. The main element of this investment process was the Freeport of Monrovia, which was opened in 1948 as the first deep sea port in the country with a rail connection.

Mano River Railway
It connected the western mining areas on the Mano River with Monrovia, via the city of Tubmanburg. This railway was  gauge.

Lamco Railway
The majority of Liberia's mines are located in its northern border area. Further south, a second iron ore loading port was set up in 1963, on the coast near Buchanan.

The Lamco Railway was built as a single track  standard gauge line, and had eight intermediate stations with passing loops. It was one of the first iron ore railways to be designed specifically for use by long trains, and to be fitted with modern aids to operation, including centrally controlled signalling. Trains on the Lamco Railway were normally made up of three  locomotives hauling ninety ore cars.

During the civil wars, the railway was damaged and fell into disuse.  However, it has recently been rebuilt by Arcelor Mittal.

Bong Mine Railway
In the 1960s, a German private investment group acquired a mining concession in the Bong Range area and founded the DELIMCO mining company. To transport the Bong Range iron ore to Monrovia for export, another railway line, which became known as the Bong Mining Railway, was constructed in 1964.

Effects of the civil wars
During the civil wars, parts of Liberia's rail network were cut off, and train operations had to be shut down due to lack of profitability. Meanwhile, Chinese construction crews worked on a renovation of the facilities, as China was interested in further developing Liberia's mineral resources. It forms part of the Mano River Railway.

See also 

 History of Liberia
 Rail transport in Liberia

References

Notes

Bibliography
  (Digitized full text, requires payment or subscription.)  about the Bong Mining Railway.

External links

Birkenhead to Liberia – Part A – Part B - reminiscences of a former Lamco Railway train driver (with images)
EMD export – Liberia - images of Liberian locomotives
 Map at the United Nations

Liberia
Rail
Rail transport in Liberia

de:Schienenverkehr in Liberia#Geschichte